Lucia El-Dahaibiová (born 22 January 1989) is a Slovak footballer who plays as a goalkeeper.

El-Dahaibiová started her career in 2004 in Union Nové Zámky. She subsequently spent two seasons on loan in Slovan Duslo Šaľa, with which she debuted in the UEFA Women's Cup in 2008, and the following year she signed for the team. In 2011, she debuted for the Slovak national team in a 2013 Euro qualifiers' 3-1 win over Estonia. As of January 2014 she is Mária Korenčiová's reserve.

In 2012, El-Dahaibiová signed for Slovan Bratislava, and in 2013 she moved to Spain to play for Sporting de Huelva, which she left in the winter break.

References

1989 births
Living people
Women's association football goalkeepers
People from Nové Zámky
Sportspeople from the Nitra Region
Slovakia women's international footballers
Sporting de Huelva players
ŠK Slovan Bratislava (women) players
FK Slovan Duslo Šaľa (women) players
FK Union Nové Zámky players
USC Landhaus Wien players
FSK St. Pölten-Spratzern players
Slovak expatriate footballers
Expatriate women's footballers in Spain
Slovak expatriate sportspeople in Spain
Slovak women's footballers
ÖFB-Frauenliga players